Berula is a cosmopolitan genus of flowering plants in the family Apiaceae, whose species are known as water parsnips, as are some other plants in Apiaceae such as Sium latifolium and Sium suave.  It is easily confused with the highly toxic water hemlock (Conium maculatum). 

Berula species are perennial, aquatic to semi-aquatic, herbaceous plants. The leaves are usually oppositely arranged. The flowerheads are arranged in umbels of small white flowers. Berula erecta is a widespread aquatic plant with fern-like leaves, found across Eurasia, Africa, North America, and elsewhere.

Taxonomy
, The Plant List accepts five species:
Berula bracteata (Roxb.) Spalik & S.R.Downie
Berula burchellii (Hook.f.) Spalik & S.R.Downie
Berula erecta (Huds.) Coville
Berula imbricata (Schinz) Spalik & S.R.Downie
Berula repanda (Welw. ex Hiern) Spalik & S.R.Downie

References

Freshwater plants
Apioideae
Apioideae genera